Cercophora  may refer to:
 Cercophora (moth), a genus of moth in the family Erebidae
 Cercophora (fungus), a genus of fungi in the family Lasiosphaeriaceae